is a Japanese figure skating coach and former competitor. As a single skater, he is a two-time Japanese national champion and represented Japan at the 1998 Winter Olympics, placing 17th.

Career

As a competitor 
Competing in single skating, Tamura won two Japanese national titles. He was selected to represent Japan at the 1998 Winter Olympics and placed 17th. Minoru Sano coached him during his career. Tamura landed a quadruple toe loop in competition in 1999 and a quadruple toe-triple toe combination in 2000. He retired from competition in 2004 and turned to coaching.

Tamura also competed briefly in pair skating, winning the 1997 national title with Marie Arai.

As a coach 
Tamura is a coach at the Kansai University Skating Club in Takatsuki, Osaka alongside Mie Hamada. His students include:
 Mariko Kihara
 Satoko Miyahara, 2015 World silver medalist and 4-time Japanese National champion (2015, 2016, 2017, 2018)
 Yuna Shiraiwa, two time Japanese Junior silver medallist (2016, 2017)
 Rika Kihira, 2017-18 Japanese Junior national champion as well as Senior national bronze and silver medallist. She was the first lady to land a 3A+3T combination in international competition (at the 2017–18 Junior Grand Prix of Figure Skating Final).
Young You, 2020 Four Continents silver medalist, 4-time South Korean National champion (2015, 18-20) and 2019 Skate Canada Bronze medalist

His former students include:
 Taichi Honda
 Marin Honda, 2016 Junior World Champion, 2017 Junior World silver medallist
 Kana Muramoto (as a singles skater)
 Satsuki Muramoto

Programs

Results
GP: Champions Series/Grand Prix

References

External links

 

Japanese male single skaters
Japanese male pair skaters
Figure skaters at the 1998 Winter Olympics
Olympic figure skaters of Japan
Japanese figure skating coaches
Living people
1979 births
Figure skaters at the 2003 Asian Winter Games
Sportspeople from Aomori Prefecture
People from Hachinohe
Competitors at the 1999 Winter Universiade